R. V. Janakiraman (8 January 1941 – 10 June 2019) was the Chief Minister of the Union Territory of Pondicherry.

Political career 

He was elected from Nellithope assembly constituency for five consecutive terms starting from 1985, 1990, 1991, 1996, and 2001. He lost the polls to All India Anna Dravida Munnetra Kazhagam candidate Om Sakthi Sekar in 2006 owing to his health ailments (Parkinson's).

He served as Chief Minister of the Union Territory of Pondicherry from 26 May 1996 to 18 March 2000 and headed the coalition government of Dravida Munnetra Kazhagam and the Tamil Maanila Congress.

Death 

Janakiraman died at age of 78 in a private hospital at Puducherry.

Electoral History

References

Chief ministers of Puducherry
Chief ministers from Dravida Munnetra Kazhagam
Dravida Munnetra Kazhagam politicians
Puducherry politicians
1941 births
2019 deaths